A Tale of Sex, Designer Drugs, and the Death of Rock n' Roll is an EP released by the American rock band Pretty Boy Floyd. It was their second album & first recording since their 1989 debut album. On this EP, Keri Kelli joined as second guitarist and Keff Ratcliffe replaced Vinnie Chas on bass.

"Everybody Needs a Hero" is a cover of a song by Keri Kelli's previous band Big Bang Babies. 

A re-recorded version of "Good Girl Gone Bad" appears on Pretty Boy Floyd's next album Porn Stars.

The EP cover is a parody of the 1995 film The Usual Suspects.

Track listing
 "Shut Up"
 "Junkie Girl"
 "Everybody Needs a Hero"  (Big Bang Babies cover)
 "Do You Love Me"
 "Good Girl Gone Bad"

Personnel
 Steve "Sex" Summers – Lead Vocals
 Kristy "Krash" Majors – Guitar
 Keri Kelli – Guitar
 Keff Ratcliffe – Bass
 Kari Kane – Drums
 Kerilynn Kelly – producer, engineer, mixing
 Kristy Krash Majors – executive producer
 Kevin Perttula – photography

Pretty Boy Floyd (American band) albums
1998 debut EPs